Rudny is a rural locality (a settlement) in Kavalerovsky District of Primorsky Krai, Russia. Population:

History
It was founded in the 1940s and was granted urban-type settlement status in 1945. It was demoted in status to that of a rural locality in December 2011.

Economy
The economy is based on plumbum-zinc ores mining and timber industry.

References

Rural localities in Primorsky Krai
Populated places established in the 1940s